Jack Kadwell (1918−2008) was an Australian professional rugby league footballer who played in the 1930s and 1940s for South Sydney and Newtown as a  and occasionally as a .

Playing career
Kadwell was a St George junior but made his first grade debut for South Sydney in Round 14 of the 1938 season.  In 1939, Kadwell played at five-eighth for Souths in the heavy grand final defeat byBalmain 33–4.  In 1941, Kadwell joined Newtown but missed out on the 1943 grand final victory over North Sydney due to injury.  In 1944, Newtown finished as minor premiers and played against Balmain in the grand final with Kadwell playing at halfback.  Newtown lost the match 19-16 but as they finished first on the table at the end of the regular season, they were allowed to challenge for a rematch.  The following week, Balmain defeated Newtown once more by a score of 12–8.  Kadwell played one more season for Newtown and retired at the end of 1945.

References

1918 births
2007 deaths
Australian rugby league players
Newtown Jets players
Rugby league halfbacks
Rugby league players from Sydney
South Sydney Rabbitohs players